Caofeidian District, formerly Tanghai County, is a district of Tangshan, Hebei, People's Republic of China, along the coast of the Bohai Sea. The district's administration is highly unusual in that apart from its seat, Tanghai and two other towns Binhai and Liuzan the rest of its administrative units are informal, mostly being farms.

Climate

References

County-level divisions of Hebei
Tangshan